Todd Woodbridge and Mark Woodforde were the defending champions but only Woodbridge competed that year with Jonas Björkman.

Björkman and Woodbridge lost in the final 2–6, 7–6 (7–4), 7–6 (7–5) against Daniel Nestor and Sandon Stolle.

Seeds
Champion seeds are indicated in bold text while text in italics indicates the round in which those seeds were eliminated.

 Daniel Nestor /  Sandon Stolle (champions)
 Jonas Björkman /  Todd Woodbridge (final)
 Joshua Eagle /  Andrew Florent (semifinals)
 Ellis Ferreira /  Brian MacPhie (quarterfinals)

Draw

Qualifying

Seeds

  Arnaud Clément /  Sébastien Grosjean (Qualifiers)
  George Bastl /  Sargis Sargsian (first round)

Qualifiers
  Arnaud Clément /  Sébastien Grosjean

Draw

References
 Men's Doubles Main Draw
 Men's Doubles Qualifying Draw

2001 Adidas International
2001 ATP Tour